Bellemare is a Norman surname, that means "somebody from Bellemare", name of several hamlets in Normandy (± 20). It is also one of the most common family names in Mauricie, Quebec. It is a compound of French belle "nice, pretty" and mare "mere, lake, pond", Norman word of Old Norse origin marr "sea", finally borrowed from Norman by French around 1600 as "pond, puddle".

History of the Canadian Bellemares
Gellineau married France Huguette Robert in Saint-Michel's catholic Church 27 June 1645. He settled the Mauricie area in 1658 and worked for three years as an indentured servant for Pierre Boucher, Governor of Trois-Rivières. Gellineau had three sons: Étienne, Jean-Baptiste and Pierre. Jean-Baptiste eventually took the name Bellemare.

Traditions
Rituals preserved by the Bellemares include the paternal blessing. Until the mid-1980s and in some cases even to this day, it has been customary for the children and grandchildren of a Bellemare family unit to ask their patriarch to bless them on New Year's Day. The practice is not exclusive to the Bellemare Family.

People
Notable people with the name include:

 Adélard Bellemare (1871–1933), Canadian politician
 Alex Bellemare (born 1993), Canadian skier
 Annie Bellemare (born 1980), Canadian figure skater
 Daniel Bellemare (born 1952), Canadian prosecutor
 Daniel Bellemare (figure skater) (born 1980), Canadian figure skater
 Diane Bellemare (born 1949), Canadian economist and politician
 Dionel Bellemare (1880–1950), Canadian politician
 Eugène Bellemare (born 1932),  Canadian politician
 Gilles Bellemare (composer) (born 1952), Canadian composer, conductor, and music educator
 Gilles Bellemare (politician) (1932–1980), member of the National Assembly of Quebec
 Jonathan Bellemare (born 1982), Canadian ice hockey player
 Marc Bellemare (born 1956), Canadian lawyer and politician
 Maurice Bellemare (1912–1989), Canadian politician
 Michel Bellemare (born 1967), Canadian politician
 Pierre Bellemare (1929-2018), French writer, novelist, radio personality, television presenter, TV producer, and director
 Pierre-Édouard Bellemare (born 1985), French ice hockey player
 Rose-Eliandre Bellemare (born 1989), French artistic gymnast
 Rykko Bellemare, Canadian film actor
 Sylvain Bellemare (born 1968), Canadian sound editor and sound designer

Footnotes

Bellemare family
Surnames